The Tachinidae are a large and variable family of true flies within the insect order Diptera, with more than 8,200 known species and many more to be discovered. Over 1,300 species have been described in North America alone. Insects in this family commonly are called tachinid flies or simply tachinids. As far as is known, they all are protelean parasitoids, or occasionally parasites, of arthropods, usually other insects.  The family is known from many habitats in all zoogeographical regions and is especially diverse in South America.

Life cycle 

Reproductive strategies vary greatly between Tachinid species, largely, but not always clearly, according to their respective life cycles. This means that they tend to be generalists rather than specialists. Comparatively few are restricted to a single host species, so there is little tendency towards the close co-evolution one finds in the adaptations of many specialist species to their hosts, such as are typical of protelean parasitoids among the Hymenoptera.

Larvae (maggots) of most members of this family are parasitoids (developing inside a living host, ultimately killing it). In contrast a few are parasitic (not generally killing the host). Tachinid larvae feed on the host tissues, either after having been injected into the host by the parent, or penetrating the host from outside. Various species have different modes of oviposition and of host invasion. Typically, Tachinid larvae are endoparasites (internal parasites) of caterpillars of butterflies and moths, or the eruciform larvae of sawflies. For example, they have been found to lay eggs in African sugarcane borer larva, a species of moth common in sub-Saharan Africa, as well as the more northerly Arctic woolly bear moth. However, some species attack adult beetles and some attack beetle larvae. Others attack various types of true bugs, and others attack grasshoppers; a few even attack centipedes. Also parasitised are bees, wasps and sawflies.

Oviposition and ovoviviparity 

Probably the majority of female Tachinids lay white, ovoid eggs with flat undersides onto the skin of the host insect. Imms mentions the genera Gymnosoma, Thrixion, Winthemia, and Eutachina as examples. In a closely related strategy some genera are effectively ovoviviparous (some authorities prefer the term ovolarviparous) and deposit a hatching larva onto the host. For example, this occurs in Tachinidae species which parasitize the butterfly Danaus chrysippus in Ghana. The free larvae immediately bore into the host's body. Illustrative genera include Exorista and Voria.  Many Tachinid eggs hatch quickly, having partly developed inside the mother's uterus, which is long and often coiled for retaining developing eggs. However, it is suggested that the primitive state probably is to stick unembryonated eggs to the surface of the host.

Many other species inject eggs into the host's body, using the extensible, penetrating part of their ovipositor, sometimes called the oviscapt, which roughly translates to "egg digger". Species in the genera Ocyptera, Alophora, and Compsilura are examples.

In many species only one egg is laid on or in any individual host, and accordingly such an egg tends to be large, as is typical for eggs laid in small numbers. They are large enough to be clearly visible if stuck onto the outside of the host, and they generally are so firmly stuck that eggs cannot be removed from the skin of the host without killing them. Furthermore, scientists have observed in studies with the host cabbage looper that being glued to the host insect helps maggots burrow into the larva, where they remain until fully developed.

Yet another strategy of oviposition among some Tachinidae is to lay large numbers of small, darkly coloured eggs on the food plants of the host species. Sturmia, Zenillia, and Gonia are such genera.

Many Tachinids are important natural enemies of major insect pests, and some species actually are used in biological pest control; for example, some species of Tachinid flies have been introduced into North America from their native lands as biocontrols to suppress populations of alien pests. Conversely, certain tachinid flies that prey on useful insects are themselves considered as pests; they can present troublesome problems in the sericulture industry by attacking silkworm larvae. One particularly notorious silkworm pest is the Uzi fly (Exorista bombycis).

Another reproductive strategy is to leave the eggs in the host's environment; for example, the female might lay on leaves, where the host is likely to ingest them. Some tachinids that are parasitoids of stem-boring caterpillars deposit eggs outside the host's burrow, letting the first instar larvae do the work of finding the host for themselves. In other species, the maggots use an ambush technique, waiting for the host to pass and then attacking it and burrowing into its body.

Adult Tachinids are not parasitic, but either do not feed at all or visit flowers, decaying matter, or similar sources of energy to sustain themselves until they have concluded their procreative activities. Their non-parasitic behaviour after eclosion from the pupa is what justifies the application of the term "protelean".

Description

Tachinid flies are extremely varied in appearance. Some adult flies may be brilliantly colored and resemble blow-flies (family Calliphoridae). Most however are rather drab, some resembling house flies. However, Tachinid flies commonly are more bristly and more robust. Also, they usually have a characteristic appearance. They have three-segmented antennae, a diagnostically prominent postscutellum bulging beneath the scutellum (a segment of the mesonotum). They are aristate flies, and the arista usually is bare, though sometimes plumose. The calypters (small flaps above the halteres) are usually very large. Their fourth long vein bends away sharply.

Adult flies feed on flowers and nectar from aphids and scale insects. As many species typically feed on pollen, they can be important pollinators of some plants, especially at higher elevations in mountains where bees are relatively few.

The taxonomy of this family presents many difficulties. It is largely based on morphological characters of the adult flies, but also on reproductive habits and on the immature stage.

As biological pest control
Some tachinid flies parasitize pest species. This has allowed them to be used as biological control agents by farmers. Some Tachinidae are generalists; for instance, Compsilura concinnata uses, at least, 200 different hosts, and they are not safe to be used as biological controls. Others are more specialized and are safer; for instance, Istocheta aldrichi, which only attacks the Japanese beetle.

Evolution

This clade appears to have originated in the middle Eocene. The oldest known putatively tachinid fossil (Lithexorista) dates from the Eocene Green River Formation in Wyoming.

See also
List of Tachinidae genera
Parasitoid wasp

References

External links

 Australasian/Oceanian Diptera Catalog
 British Insects: the Families of Diptera
 Bugguide.net: North American Tachinidae
 Diptera.info
 Diptera: Tachinidae - ENY 3005 Family Identification
 Handbooks for the Identification of British Insects, Vol. X. Part 4(a): Diptera CyclorrhaphaCalyptrata (I) Section (a). Tachinidae and Calliphoridae (1st portion) (2nd portion), by F.I. van Emden (1954), Royal Entomological Society of London
 Key to the genera of Tachinidae in the eastern US
 NADS Homepage for Tachinidae Resources
 Rhinophorids - when a tachinid isn't a tachinid!
 TachImage Gallery
 Tachinid Flies - Family Tachinidae, diagnostic photographs of 8 species by Cirrus Digital Imaging
 Tachinid Morphology J. E. O'Hara, North American Dipterists Society
 The Siphonini (Diptera: Tachinidae) of Europe (preview), by Stig Andersen (1996)
 UK Tachinid Recording Scheme
 Stireman, J. TACHINIDAE: Evolution, Behavior, and Ecology
 A conspectus of the Tachinidae (Diptera) of Australia, including keys to the supraspecific taxa and taxonomic and host catalogues

 
Insects used as insect pest control agents
Diptera used as pest control agents
Brachycera families